The Hibiki-class ocean surveillance ship is a class of surveillance ships operated by the Japan Maritime Self-Defense Force. The ships have a small-waterplane-area twin hull (SWATH) design.

History
The Hibiki class was developed in response to the launch of the s by the Soviet Union, and their deployments in the waters near Japan. The Defense Agency announced plans to develop a surveillance ship in 1989.

The first Hibiki-class vessel was commissioned on January 23, 1991, and the second, Harima, on March 10, 1992.

Construction
All three vessels of the class have been built by Mitsui Engineering & Shipbuilding at its Tamano shipyard.

Operations
Hibiki and Harima operate out of Kure, Hiroshima. The United States and Japan reportedly split the costs of operating the Hibiki vessels, which approximately US$20 million per year.

Characteristics
Each vessel has a crew of 40, including five American civilian technicians, and a flight deck for helicopters to operate off of. They are able to deploy on station for 90 days.

The vessels have an AN/UQQ-2 Surveillance Towed Array Sensor System (SURTASS), which is installed in the United States. Data from the sensors is relayed through the Defense Satellite Communications System, and processed and shared with the United States. The data is fed into the Integrated Undersea Surveillance System.

Propulsion is provided by four Mitsubishi S6U-MPTK diesel electric engines.

Ships in the class

References

Auxiliary ships of the Japan Maritime Self-Defense Force
Auxiliary surveillance ship classes
 
Ships built by Mitsui Engineering and Shipbuilding